Clawson Public Schools is a school district in Michigan, headquartered in Clawson in Metro Detroit. The district's size allows for individual attention. Despite its small size, Clawson offers students many opportunities such as enrollment in the Center for Advanced Studies and the Arts and Oakland Schools Technical Campus.

The Madison District Public Schools of Madison Heights contracts its busing services to Clawson.

Schools
 Clawson High School
 Clawson Middle School
 Clawson School Preschool Program (early childhood/pre-school)
 Kenwood Elementary School
 Schalm Elementary School

Schalm Elementary serves children through fifth grade living north of 14 Mile Road and/or west of Rochester. Kenwood serves those south of 14 Mile and/or east of Rochester. There is a bus service for any child who has to cross more than one of those roads. The middle school and high school do not have any busing.

References

External links

 Clawson Public Schools
 CASA
 OSTC

School districts in Michigan
Education in Oakland County, Michigan